Hendrik van den Keere (c. 1540–2 – 1580) was a sixteenth-century punchcutter, or cutter of punches to make metal type, who lived in Ghent in modern Belgium.

Career

Van den Keere was the son of Ghent printer and schoolmaster Hendrik van den Keere the Elder, and his career has sometimes been confused with that of his father. Both he and his father used the name "Henri du Tour" in French.

Van den Keere's grandfather had taken over the type foundry of Joos Lambrecht. In 1566 he took over his father's printing firm, but soon gave up printing and began to specialise in punchcutting. 

From 1568 he worked particularly for Christophe Plantin of Antwerp, who operated a gigantic printing concern by contemporary standards. Van den Keere stayed living in Ghent, up the River Scheldt from Antwerp. He was Plantin's sole typecaster from 1569 onwards. 

Over the course of his career he cut around 30 typefaces.

Types
Van den Keere primarily cut punches in the textura style of blackletter, roman type and music type. Shown are some images of van den Keere's types, all from the Plantin specimen of c. 1585.

The largest roman types cut by van den Keere had very bold proportions, a high x-height and a dense type colour on the page, much bolder than earlier types in the Garamond style. This style remained popular in the Low Countries after his death; the standard term for it is "Dutch taste" or goût Hollandois, the description used by Pierre-Simon Fournier for it. Hendrik Vervliet has suggested that the goal was to create roman type "comparable for weight with Gothic letters" at a time when blackletter was still very popular for continuous reading in body text. His Gros canon was used by Plantin in his 1574 Commune sanctorum, a church liturgy choirbook intended to be readable at a distance by an entire choir. John A. Lane comments that his roman types "must be accepted as a major innovation...[they] influenced the seventeenth-century Dutch types that in turn influenced types in England and elsewhere" although Leon Voet felt that they "never quite equaled the elegance of his French models". 

As influences on his types, Lane suggests types by Ameet Tavernier, Robert Granjon and Pierre Haultin, and Vervliet an earlier type cut by Maarten de Keyser. His body text type in contrast is more similar to earlier French types by the established French engravers such as Claude Garamond and Granjon.

One of the more striking features of van den Keere's largest roman types is considerable variation in proportions to modern eyes: letters like 'n' and 'u' are very narrow while round letters such as 'o' stay near-circular. Digital font designer Fred Smeijers speculates that van den Keere wanted to "make the type economical" with the letters that could be compressed, while at the time it would not be normal to condense the circular letters: "it was to be two centuries" before truly condensed types which condensed all letters. Smeijers noted that van den Keere's style could not be an accident as he "could work perfectly in the French tradition" when he wanted to, when cutting smaller types.

Van den Keere also cut a rotunda gothic type, apparently based on Spanish lettering and intended for a book to be sent to Spain, a Civilité and in Lane's view probably a spectacular set of Gothic capitals used as initials with an intricate, interlaced design. He is not known to have cut any italic types, which were not popular in the Netherlands during the 1570s. His largest types were cut in wood and then duplicated by sand casting. 

Besides his own types, he justified matrices (setting their spacing) from other engravers, cut replacement characters for some of Plantin's types with shorter ascenders and descenders to allow tighter linespacing, and in 1572 compiled an inventory for Plantin of the types Plantin owned. Van den Keere also owned matrices for type by other engravers, at the end of his life owning three roman types by Claude Garamond, two romans by Ameet Tavernier, and six italics and a music type by Robert Granjon.

Many of van den Keere's punches, matrices and wooden pattern letters survive at the Plantin-Moretus Museum:

Legacy
Van den Keere died young between 11 July and October 1580, giving him a mature career of only about 12 years, likely as a result of a leg injury he mentioned in his final letter to Plantin. Van den Keere's family were Protestants, and with the capture of Ghent in 1584 by Spanish royal forces van den Keere's daughter Colette (or Coletta) and his son Pieter, who became an engraver and mapmaker, lived in London around the period 1584 – 1593. There in 1587 at the Dutch Church, Austin Friars, Colette married Jodocus Hondius, a mapmaker who was probably also a punchcutter. Pieter sometimes collaborated with him. All three later returned to the Netherlands; following Hondius's death Colette took over his publishing business.

In 1581, van den Keere's widow sold many of his punches and matrices to Plantin. Plantin's successors preserved the sixteenth-century materials and records of his printing office, which became the Plantin-Moretus Museum, and a large amount of van den Keere's work survives intact there. 

Thomas de Vechter, van den Keere's foreman, also acquired many of his materials from his widow, documented in a surviving inventory. He moved to Antwerp and then Leiden, establishing a type foundry casting many van den Keere types. De Vechter's foundry was later taken over by Arent Corsz Hogenacker in stages from 1619 – 1623, and on the closure of his type foundry in 1672 his types reached other Dutch foundries. Matrices for the interlaced capitals ended up owned by the type foundry of Koninklijke Joh. Enschedé.

A close copy of van den Keere's Gros Canon capitals was used in Spain for over a century after his death, with a later copy on two-line great primer size cut by punchcutter Pedro Disses in c. 1686, which remained in use until the late eighteenth century, especially in Andalusia.

Digital fonts
Digital font designers who have designed interpretations of van den Keere's roman type include Frank E. Blokland whose company Dutch Type Library (DTL) has published revivals of his roman types under the names DTL Vandenkeere and DTL Gros Canon for a display size; DTL Vandenkeere is used in signage at the Plantin-Moretus Museum. DTL has also published Flamande by Matthew Carter, a revival of his textura. In 2016 Blokland received a doctorate on the spacing and proportions of early metal type, including van den Keere's, from Leiden University. 

Kris Sowersby, whose Heldane typeface is based on van den Keere's work, describes it as "dense, sharp and powerful...I love van den Keere’s texturas. I can feel the influence of them within his roman forms: they’re both narrow, dense and sharp". Hoefler & Co.'s release notes for its Quarto typeface describe van den Keere's Two-Line Double Pica display-sized roman (shown above; size is around 42pt) as "an arresting design marked by striking dramatic tensions"; designer Sara Soskolne has said that she was attracted to "its crispness, its drama" but noted that they removed details such as the wide horizontal of the centre bar of the 'E' which she felt did not work. 

Fred Smeijers, whose TEFF Renard typeface is based on his work, felt that basing a typeface on his work produced a "solid and sturdy variant of the Garamond style" and that he was "one of the first to make roman display types that were explicitly conceived as such."

Notes

References

Cited literature

1580 deaths
Businesspeople from Ghent
Music engravers
Belgian typographers and type designers
Businesspeople of the Habsburg Netherlands
1540s births